Nika is a 2022 Russian biographical drama film written and directed by Vasilisa Kuzmina, Based on real events, the Soviet poetess Nika Turbina, performed by Elizaveta Yankovskaya, and Turbina's mother played by Anna Mikhalkova. 

It was theatrically released in Russia on May 19, 2022, by Central Partnership.

Plot 
As a child, Nika Turbina, together with her mother, toured the Soviet Union. Nika's life turned out to be short, but full of dramatic events. Having become famous throughout the USSR for the poems that came to her in dreams and were recorded by her mother, the girl spent her entire childhood on tour around the country, being interviewed, attending bohemian parties, and having meetings with celebrities. Readers were struck by her childish sadness and the poignancy of her verses.

But the end of the 1990s are dawning, and 27-year-old Nika has not been writing for a long time, inspiration has left her. Its place has been taken over by alcohol and attempts to understand herself. Where did her “voice” and motherly love disappear to? Can she be happy? A meeting with a cheerful and independent Ivan, who abandoned the career of a diplomat, gives hope to the girl.

Cast

Production 
Principal photography took place in Moscow and on the Russian Black Sea Coast.

References

External links 
 

2022 films
2020s Russian-language films
2022 biographical drama films
Russian biographical drama films
Films about mother–daughter relationships
Biographical films about poets
Films shot in Moscow